Pindori Khurd also known as New Pindori is a small village located in Wazirabad Tehsil, Gujranwala District, Punjab, Pakistan. SAFDAR HUSSAIN CHEEMA is very famous person and he is working as fabrication contractor and he helped his village people and give them job. Mr. Safdar has three son and all of them well educated and become Petroleum Engineer, Lawyer and Software Engineer.

Demography 
Pindori Khurd has a population of over 1,800 and is located about 41 kilometres northwest of Gujranwala city. The population is over 97% Muslim while only 3% is Christian. Most people in the village speak Punjabi, though almost all of them can also speak the national language of Pakistan, Urdu. English is spoken by the educated elite in the Pindori Khurd. Village has all basic facilities else government hospital and natural gas.

Education 
For education in the village a Government Schools are functional by Government of Punjab, Pakistan under Board of Intermediate and Secondary Education, Gujranwala. For higher-level education some student move to Kalaske Cheema, for higher university level education people move to Gujranwala and Lahore. While some private institute also functions in the area.

 Government Boys Primary School (GPS), Pindori Khurd

Communication 
The only way to get Pindori Khurd is by road. Pindori Khurd is directly connected with Kalaske Cheema. Besides driving your own car (which takes about 1 hour and 10 minutes from Gujranwala, 35 minutes from Ali Pur Chatta). The Wazirabad-Faisalabad rail link is the only nearest railway line and Rasool Nagar is the nearest railway station.

See also 

 Bega Kalan
 Dharam Kot
 Pindori Kalan

References 

Villages in Gujranwala District